Stephen P. Mugar (March 5, 1901 – October 16, 1982) was the founder of the Star Market chain of supermarkets in New England. He was also a philanthropist and the most prominent member of the Mugar family of Greater Boston.

Early life
Mugar was born March 5, 1901, in Kharpert (Harput) in the Mamuret-ul-Aziz Vilayet of the Ottoman Empire (present-day Turkey), of Armenian parents. His father, Sarkis, and mother, Vosgitel, and his two sisters, Alice and Mary, whose family name was shortened from Mugardichian, were Armenians who came to the United States from the Ottoman Empire in 1906 to join his father's brothers who owned a restaurant on Massachusetts Avenue in Boston. Another sister, Helen,  was born after their arrival in Massachusetts. The 1910 United States Census shows the family in the 19th Ward of Boston and lists Sarkis Mugar's occupation as "waiter in restaurant." In 1916, Sarkis Mugar paid $800.00 for the Star Market, a small grocery store,  at 28 Mt. Auburn Street in Watertown and Stephen eventually went to work for his father in the store.

Early career
In 1922, Stephen's father was killed at age 49 from complications from an automobile accident, leaving Stephen to take over the Star Market to support his mother, himself and his sisters. The second Star Market was opened in Newtonville in 1932 and the third one was opened in Wellesley in 1937.

Later career
After the war ended and wartime restrictions and shortages were over, Stephen worked with his younger cousin John M. Mugar to expand Star Market throughout Greater Boston to meet the increased affluence and consumer demand. The second Star Market in Newtonville opened in 1948 and was the Mugar's first supermarket. It was the prototype of the other modern supermarkets that Stephen and John opened during this period. Meats and produce were packaged in cellophane wrappers to make them more appealing to consumers. A conveyor belt carried bags of groceries to a  central pickup station by the parking lot. Customers tired of no self-service at stores such as A&P or self-service but little else at First National Stores Finast came from miles around to patronize the new Star Market.

Philanthropic giving by Stephen Mugar
After making his fortune in the Star Market business, Stephen P. Mugar became a generous contributor to educational institutions and Armenian causes locally and abroad.

Armenian Assembly of America
The Armenian Assembly of America is a non-profit group aimed at increased Armenian-American participation in the American democratic process as well as assisting in humanitarian and development programs in Armenia. Stephen Mugar gave generously during his lifetime and his estate in 1984 gave one million dollars to help launch its endowment fund.

Mugar Hall at Tufts
The Mugar Hall at The Fletcher School of Law and Diplomacy at Tufts University was given in memory of his parents.

Mugar Library at Haigazian University
The Mugar Library at Haigazian University, an Armenian institution in Beirut, Lebanon, was given in memory of his parents.

Mugar Life Sciences Building at Northeastern
The Mugar Life Sciences Building at Northeastern University, which contains the Departments of Biology, Cellular and Molecular Biology, Behavioral Neuroscience, and Chemical Engineering, and laboratories and classrooms, was given in 1963 in memory of his parents.

Mugar Memorial Library
The Mugar Memorial Library at Boston University was given in memory of his parents.

Gifts in memory of Marian and Stephen Mugar

Armenian Library & Museum of America
In 1992, the former Coolidge Bank building in Watertown, which was bought by the Armenian Library and Museum of America in 1988,  was dedicated to the memory of Stephen Pabken Mugar and Marian Graves Mugar.

Mugar Omni Theater
In 1985, David Mugar gave the money for the Marian G. and Stephen P. Mugar Omni Theater at the Museum of Science, Boston.

Mugar Building at Cape Cod Hospital
In 2002, David Mugar gave $5,000,000.00 to the Cape Cod Hospital in Hyannis for a new four story wing in memory of Marian and Stephen.

Endowed Chair of Armenian Genocide Studies
Carolyn Mugar and her husband, John O'Connor, shortly before his death on November 30, 2002, made a gift to Clark University in Worcester, Massachusetts to establish the Endowed Chair of Armenian Genocide Studies,  which is named for "Robert Aram and Marianne Kaloosdian and Stephen and Marian Mugar." The current holder of the chair is Taner Akcam.

Marriage and Family
In the 1930s, Stephen Mugar married Marian Graves (born June 29, 1901, in Saugus), and they had two children: David Graves Mugar, who became a business leader and philanthropist in his own right, and Carolyn Mugar, activist,  who started a reforestation project in Armenia and is executive director of Farm Aid. Stephen and Marian Mugar lived first in Watertown and then in Belmont for many years. Stephen's business was in Boston, then moved further out to Burlington. Stephen Mugar died on October 16, 1982, and was buried in Mount Auburn Cemetery. Marian Mugar died November 29, 1984, in Belmont and was buried next to her husband in Mount Auburn.

References

1901 births
1982 deaths
People from Elazığ
People from Mamuret-ul-Aziz vilayet
Emigrants from the Ottoman Empire to the United States
American grocers
American people of Armenian descent
People from Belmont, Massachusetts
Burials at Mount Auburn Cemetery
20th-century American businesspeople
20th-century American philanthropists